Déborah Lassource (born 29 September 1999) is a French female handballer who plays for Paris 92 and the French national team as a left back and centre back.

She represented France at the 2022 European Women's Handball Championship in Slovenia, Montenegro and North Macedonia.

She is the younger sister of Coralie Lassource, who plays for Brest Bretagne Handball. They used to play together at Issy Paris Hand. Their mother also used to play handball.

Honours

Club

Domestic 

 French league (Division 1 Féminine):
 3rd: 2016, 2017, 2022  (with Issy Paris Hand / Paris 92)

 French Cup (Coupe de France):
 Runner up: 2017 (with Issy Paris Hand)

National team 

 European Championship
 2022: 4th
 European Women's U-19 Handball Championship
 2017:

References

External links

1999 births
Living people
French female handball players
People from Maisons-Laffitte
21st-century French women